Pertheville-Ners is a commune in the Calvados department in the Normandy region in northwestern France.

History
The commune resulted from the fusion in 1858 of Pertheville (259 inhabitants in 1856) and Ners (113 inhabitants).

Administration
The mayor from 1990 to March 2008 was Michel Mallet, a farmer, who was politically independent. The mayor from 2008 until 2014 was Joël Patard, a teacher, also an independent. The current mayor, elected in 2014 and 2020, is Séverine Lepetit.

Population

Sights
The church of Saint-Aubin at Ners
The church of Saint-Pierre at Pertheville
The chateau
The Manoir du Chêne Sec (Manor House of the Dry Oak)

See also
Communes of the Calvados department

References

Communes of Calvados (department)
Calvados communes articles needing translation from French Wikipedia